Richard Pramotton (born 9 May 1964) is an Italian former alpine skier.

Biography
The brother of other alpine skier Roger, he was born at Courmayeur. He was a specialist of giant slalom, a discipline in which he scored three victories, all in 1986. He was the first Italian after the age of Gustav Thöni and Piero Gros to classify in the top five of the Alpine Skiing World Cup, with a fifth position overall in 1987.

Worls Cup results
Race victories

See also
 Italy national alpine ski team at the Olympics
 Italian skiers who closed in top 10 in overall World Cup

References

External links
 
 

1964 births
Living people
Italian male alpine skiers
Alpine skiers of Gruppo Sportivo Esercito
Sportspeople from Aosta Valley
People from Courmayeur